Eka Dawasaka Api (The Day We Will) (එක දවසක අපි) is a 2018 Sri Lankan Sinhala romantic film directed by Anuruddha Jayasinghe, produced by Vinode Productions and Executive Producer Arosha Fernando for Universal Media. It stars Pubudu Chathuranga and newcomer Nayanathara Wickramaarachchi in lead roles.. Music composed by Navaratne Gamage. The film has been shot around central hills of Sri Lanka, from Mahiyangana, Mawanella and the surrounding areas of Kandy and Peradeniya mean while in University of Peradeniya.

The muhurat ceremony was celebrated at the Regal Theatre, Colombo. The film was released on 1 February 2018 for a limited period in 40 film theaters across Sri Lanka in the CEL Film Circuit. The film was also will be available in Dialog's Vinode mobile app as well. It is the 1295th Sri Lankan film in the Sinhala cinema.

Plot
Film starts with the sound of Mala Beraya (Drum which is playing for funeral) and aimed to Parami and Vimukthi. Both gathered in the city and get to the train for their journey as they discussed.

Cast
 Pubudu Chathuranga as Vimukthi
 Nayanathara Wickramaarachchi as Parami
 Veena Jayakody as Vimukthi's mother
 Medha Jayaratne as Vimukthi's sister
 Nayana Hettiarachchi as Parami's aunt
 Disni Rajapaksa as Nishu, Vimukthi's proposed girl
 Rohan Ranatunga as Vimukthi's friend
 Gayan Hettiarachchi
 Pavithra Wickramasinghe as Kusum, Nishu's mother

References

s; film club

2018 films
2010s Sinhala-language films